= Süren Erdenebayar =

Mongolian freestyle wrestler (1969-2012)

Personal information
- Nationality: Mongolian
- Born: 1969
- Died: 2012 (aged 42–43)

Sport
- Sport: Freestyle wrestling
Medal record
Men's freestyle wrestling
Representing Mongolia
U-20 World Championships
Gold medal – first place	1989 Ulaanbaatar	57 kg

Süren Erdenebayar (1969–2012) was a Mongolian freestyle wrestler. He took the 1989 U-20 Wrestling World Championships in the Prospect Youth category, known as Espoir, winning the gold medal in the men's 57 category.
